Slobodan Pavković (born 24 October 1955) is a Serbian former footballer and manager and the current technical director for the Football Association of Singapore (FAS). The 52-year-old officially started work at FAS on 1 April 2008 and takes over the role vacated by current Home United coach P N Sivaji.

Pavkovic comes with vast experience having coached at the highest levels with the Kuwait National Team, the Serbia U-19 Team, as well as top club sides in Egypt, Kuwait, Oman, Sweden and his native Serbia.

Prior to coaching, he had a long playing career, first with Yugoslav First League clubs FK Vojvodina and FK Partizan and afterwards with Swedish Degerfors IF. He was also capped at national level at both U-19 and U-21 teams, with the highlight coming in 1978 where they were crowned champions in the UEFA U-21 Championship 1978.

He was member of the Vojvodina championship winning generation.  Because of his style and look, he became one of the first footballers who had become teenage girls idols and he was often seen in magazines such as Zdravo or ITD which were directed towards teenage audience at that time.  He was also a guitarist of a local rock band named Rani Mraz, but at one point he had to choose between his footballer or musical career, having definitely opted for the first one at the time he moved to the capital Belgrade by signing with Partizan.

As the Technical Director, he will be responsible for the systematic implementation of player development and coaching education programmes to improve the overall standard of play in Singapore. He will also lead technical study groups to assess the level of play in Singapore and make recommendations to the Football Excellence Committee of FAS. 

Pavković also authored a comprehensive syllabus, due to be published before the end of the year, for the development of Singapore football.

References

External links
 Pavkovic and Bozenko share expertise
 FAS technical director mulls new deal

1955 births
Living people
Serbian footballers
Yugoslav footballers
Association football midfielders
FK Vojvodina players
FK Partizan players
FK Zemun players
Yugoslav First League players
Degerfors IF players
Serbian expatriate footballers
Expatriate footballers in Sweden
Serbian football managers
Serbian expatriate football managers
FK Vojvodina managers
Kuwait SC managers
Al-Nasr SC (Kuwait) managers